Barrie Jean Borich is an American writer. She is best known for her memoirs My Lesbian Husband: Landscapes of a Marriage, which won a Stonewall Book Award in 2000 and was a shortlisted Lambda Literary Award nominee for Lesbian Biography at the 12th Lambda Literary Awards, and Body Geographic, which won the Lambda for Lesbian Biography/Memoir at the 26th Lambda Literary Awards.

Originally from Chicago, Illinois, she spent much of her adult life living in Minneapolis, Minnesota until returning to Chicago in 2012 to teach creative writing at DePaul University.

Works
Restoring the Color of Roses (1993)
My Lesbian Husband: Landscapes of a Marriage (1999)
Body Geographic (2013)

References

American memoirists
American lesbian writers
Living people
Writers from Chicago
Lambda Literary Award winners
Stonewall Book Award winners
DePaul University faculty
Year of birth missing (living people)
Lesbian memoirists
American women memoirists
LGBT people from Illinois
20th-century American non-fiction writers
21st-century American non-fiction writers
20th-century American women writers
21st-century American women writers
Lesbian academics
American women academics
21st-century American LGBT people